In college football, 1983 NCAA football bowl games may refer to:

1982–83 NCAA football bowl games, for games played in January 1983 as part of the 1982 season.
1983–84 NCAA football bowl games, for games played in December 1983 as part of the 1983 season.